Wayne Jackson (born 16 April 1944) is best known for his tenure as the CEO of the Australian Football League (AFL) from 1996 to 2003.

SANFL 
Jackson played 71 games for West Torrens Football Club in the South Australian National Football League from 1965 to 1971 .

From 1975 when he took up the role of Chairman of West Torrens, Jackson embarked on a long and distinguished period of football administration. He was President of West Torrens in 1979; a SANFL League Director for West Torrens (1975–1979); member of the SANFL Player Retention Committee (1988–1992); and Member of the SANFL Football Commission (1991–1994).

AFL 
Jackson became a Member of the AFL Commission in 1995, then took over the role of CEO in 1996.

In his time as CEO of the AFL during the 1990s Jackson continued the expansion of the game into a national competition, initially started by Allen Aylett during the 1970s. He was a strong champion of the sixteen-team competition and, during his tenure at the AFL, supported then struggling clubs the Western Bulldogs and Kangaroos with several million dollars being made available from various redistributions of AFL monies which became known as the "Competitive Balance Fund".

He presided over the $500 million television rights deal in 2001 that saw coverage move from the Seven Network to the partnership of Nine Network, Network Ten and Foxtel (Fox Footy Channel). It was also during this period that the AFL sold off the former VFL/AFL headquarters of Waverley Park.

Jackson announced on 15 April 2003 that he would be leaving the role at the end of the season, handing the reins to Andrew Demetriou.

Football achievements summary
 Chairman of West Torrens 1975–1978
 President of West Torrens 1979
 SANFL League Director for West Torrens 1975–1979
 Member of SANFL Retention Committee 1988–1992
 Member of South Australian Football Commission 1991–1994
 Member of the Australian Football League Commission 1995
 Australian Football League CEO 1996–2003
 Member of AFL NTFL Board 2004 – ongoing
 Amateur Football for University 1962–1964
 71 games for West Torrens 1965–1971
 Coached West Torrens (Reserves) 1972
 Coached West Torrens (both League and Reserves) 1974
 Twice All Australian University Amateur Footballer
 Life Member of West Torrens 1979
 Member of the South Australian Football Hall of Fame (inducted 2004)

Other 
Jackson completed a Bachelor of Economics at the University of Adelaide and a Management Development Program at the Harvard Business School. He has worked in several positions, including Managing Director of Thomas Hardy & Sons Pty Limited, General Manager and Director of BRL Hardy Limited and Managing Director of The South Australian Brewing Company Pty Limited.

Wayne also attended Prince Alfred College.

External links 
 
 SANFL Hall of Fame
 ABC Four Corners interview 2002
 Meat & Livestock Australia Directors' bio

Australian chief executives
1944 births
Living people
People educated at Prince Alfred College
Harvard Business School alumni
South Australian National Football League administrators
West Torrens Football Club players
West Torrens Football Club coaches
West Torrens Football Club administrators
VFL/AFL administrators
Australian rules footballers from South Australia
South Australian Football Hall of Fame inductees